The name Debby has been used for seven tropical cyclones in the Atlantic Ocean.
 Hurricane Debby (1982) reached Category 4 strength, grazed Bermuda, and caused high winds at Cape Race, but no significant damage.
 Hurricane Debby (1988) reached hurricane strength just before landfall at Tuxpan, Mexico, killing ten, but remained a hurricane for only six hours and later became Tropical Depression 17-E in the Pacific.
 Tropical Storm Debby (1994) formed near and passed over Saint Lucia, later dissipated over Hispañola; nine deaths were reported, and flooding and mudslides on Saint Lucia were severe.
 Hurricane Debby (2000) was a disorganized storm that caused minor damage to the Leeward Islands and Puerto Rico, but actually helped relieve a severe Cuban drought.
 Tropical Storm Debby (2006) formed south of Cape Verde and dissipated in the Central Atlantic.
 Tropical Storm Debby (2012) formed near the Yucatán peninsula, made landfall in Florida and then became post-tropical near the Bahamas.
 Tropical Storm Debby (2018) formed in the open waters of the North Atlantic, did not affect land.

Atlantic hurricane set index articles